Mika Mäkitalo (born 12 June 1985) is a Finnish professional footballer who currently plays for TPS.

References

External links
Profile at Guardian Football
Profile at RoPS

1985 births
Living people
Finnish footballers
Veikkausliiga players
FC Haka players
FC Inter Turku players
Rovaniemen Palloseura players
Association football midfielders
People from Raisio
Sportspeople from Southwest Finland